The Debenham Islands are a group of islands and rocks lying between Millerand Island and the west coast of Graham Land. The Debenham Islands were discovered and named by the British Graham Land Expedition (BGLE) (1934–37) under John Riddoch Rymill; the BGLE base was on Barry Island, in the center of the group, during part of this time. They were named for Frank Debenham, who served as a member of the BGLE Advisory Committee.

The Argentinian San Martín Base is located on Barry Island.

See also 
 Composite Antarctic Gazetteer
 List of Antarctic islands south of 60° S
 Powell Channel
 Scientific Committee on Antarctic Research
 Territorial claims in Antarctica

Further reading 
  Ben Saul, Tim Stephens, editors Antarctica in International Law, P 269

References
 

Islands of Graham Land
Fallières Coast